I'yad Hutba (born November 20, 1987) is an Israeli association football player who plays for Maccabi Bnei Reineh.

He is a defender, and plays for the Israel national football team.  He also played for Hapoel Tel Aviv between 2011-2013 .

References

1987 births
Living people
Israeli footballers
Footballers from Northern District (Israel)
People from Reineh
Maccabi Kafr Kanna F.C. players
Hapoel Petah Tikva F.C. players
Hapoel Tel Aviv F.C. players
Maccabi Ahi Nazareth F.C. players
Maccabi Bnei Reineh F.C. players
Israel international footballers
Israeli Premier League players
Liga Leumit players
Association football midfielders
Arab citizens of Israel
Arab-Israeli footballers
Association football fullbacks